Pajsije II was Archbishop of Peć and Serbian Patriarch for a short time during 1758. He was an ethnic Greek.

Before he became Serbian Patriarch, he was Metropolitan of Užice and Valjevo, under Vikentije I. In 1758, when patriarch Vikentije went to Constantinople, metropolitan Pajsije traveled with him. While staying in Constantinople, Serbian Patriarch was struck with sudden illness and died. Metropolitan Pajsije took the opportunity and succeeded in becoming new Serbian Patriarch as "Pajsije II". His tenure was very short since in that time Serbian Patriarchate of Peć was in constant internal turmoil. His main rival was another Greek, metropolitan Gavrilo, who succeeded in overthrowing Pajsije II and becoming new Serbian Patriarch as Gavrilo IV.

References

Sources

External links
 Official site of the Serbian Orthodox Church: Serbian Archbishops and Patriarchs

Pajsije II
18th-century Greek people
Greeks from the Ottoman Empire